Walter Stuart "Walt" Ashbaugh (born March 11, 1929, in East Liverpool, Ohio – died April 3, 2003, in Toledo, Ohio) was an American track and field athlete and basketball player.  He competed in the triple jump at the 1952 Olympics, finishing fourth.  His second round jump of  put him into the bronze medal position until Soviet Leonid Shcherbakov leaped into silver medal position, pushing Ashbaugh off the podiumm.  Earlier that year, he was also the National Champion in the event, breaking Gay Bryan's 4-year streak.  Running for Cornell University, he also competed in the 120 yard high hurdles in which he held the school record.  He was also a pivotman on the basketball team, during their most successful 1950–1 season with a 20–5 record.

References

External links 
 

1929 births
2003 deaths
Athletes (track and field) at the 1952 Summer Olympics
Olympic track and field athletes of the United States
People from East Liverpool, Ohio
Track and field athletes from Ohio
Cornell Big Red men's track and field athletes
Cornell Big Red men's basketball players
American men's basketball players
20th-century American people